Steven Gey (born 1956, died June 9, 2011) was an American legal academic and one of the leading US scholars on religious liberties and free speech.  He was David and Deborah Fonvielle and Donald and Janet Hinkle Professor at Florida State University College of Law.  His scholarship includes Cases and Materials on Religion and the State (Lexis-Michie 2001) and dozens of articles on religious liberties, free speech, and constitutional interpretation.  Gey was an active participant in national debates regarding the teaching of evolution in public schools and he served as a regular commentator on legal issues for ABC News in the aftermath of the 2000 presidential election.  In 2007, he received the "Friend of Darwin Award" from the National Center for Science Education, recognizing his tireless advocacy for the teaching of science in schools.

Gey received his law degree from Columbia Law School, from which he graduated in 1982 with highest honors and where he was an articles editor of the Columbia Law Review. Before joining the faculty at Florida State, Gey practiced law for two years at the Paul Weiss law firm in New York, where he did extensive pro bono work, often on behalf of those facing the death penalty.  

In 2006, he was diagnosed with Amyotrophic lateral sclerosis (ALS, sometimes called Lou Gehrig's disease, Maladie de Charcot or motor neurone disease)—a progressive, fatal neurodegenerative disease caused by the degeneration of motor neurons. He died June 9, 2011.

A permanent law fellowship position with Americans United for Separation of Church and State is named in honor of Gey, in appreciation of his efforts regarding religious freedoms.

References

External links
 Florida State University College of Law faculty profile

American legal scholars
Columbia Law School alumni
Florida State University faculty
1956 births
2011 deaths
Deaths from motor neuron disease
Neurological disease deaths in the United States